Splatt may refer to:

People
Clem Splatt, Australian rules footballer 
William Splatt, Australian politician

Places
Splatt, Cornwall, a hamlet

See also
Splat (disambiguation)
Splott, a district in Cardiff, Wales

Surnames of British Isles origin